Heat-shrink may refer to:
 Heat-shrink tubing, for electrical work
 Heat-shrinkable sleeve, for pipelines
 Shrink wrap, for packaging